A leadership election was held in October 2013 to select Kevin Rudd's replacement as leader of the Australian Labor Party and Leader of the Opposition. Bill Shorten was elected party leader, and Tanya Plibersek was later confirmed as deputy leader.

The declared candidates were Bill Shorten and Anthony Albanese, who were both ministers in the outgoing Labor government. Nominations closed on 20 September 2013.

Under new rules, the new leader was elected by public members of the Australian Labor Party over a period of twenty days, followed by a ballot of the Labor parliamentary party.  Each of these two voting blocs was weighted equally in determining the winner.

During the leadership election, Chris Bowen, former Treasurer of Australia and Member of Parliament for McMahon, was Interim Leader of the Labor Party and served as Leader of the Opposition.

Tanya Plibersek was unopposed in succeeding Anthony Albanese as deputy leader.

Background
After three years of instability in the Labor leadership in which four leadership spills were held between Kevin Rudd and Julia Gillard, this contest featured neither.  Gillard retired from parliament at the election, while Rudd announced on election night that he would step down as Labor leader and return to the backbench in his concession speech at the Gabba in Brisbane following Labor's defeat.

Earlier in the year the ALP caucus approved changes to the way the federal parliamentary leader is chosen. The new rules make it more difficult to change leaders and require a ballot of the party membership on contested leadership spills. The new rules encourage the parliamentary party to only nominate one candidate, to avoid a month-long ballot of the general party membership. The new rules are controversial, however, and have been publicly criticised by ALP Senator Stephen Conroy and former Prime Minister Julia Gillard.

Nominations opened at a parliamentary party meeting on Friday 13 September 2013, and remained open for a week. Anthony Albanese and Bill Shorten formally nominated. As there was more than one nomination, a ballot of the parliamentary party and another of the organisational party were required. The ballot of the organisational party lasted for two weeks.

Process
Under the new Labor rules, nominations were open for one week beginning 13 September 2013.  To be a nominated candidate, a nominee must receive the support of 20% of caucus.  After the conclusion of nominations, ballots were sent to grassroots party members, who had two weeks to return their ballots.  On 10 October 2013, the caucus cast their vote for leader and the grassroots ballots were counted.  The two voting pools were weighted 50/50 (Caucus and grassroots each consisting 50% of the final count)  and the leader declared elected accordingly.

Historically, the ALP have determined the members of cabinet (or shadow cabinet) in caucus, with the leader assigning portfolios.  This is unchanged, and the parliamentary caucus of Labor elected the executive at the same time they cast voters for leader.  Only the election for the parliamentary leader involved the votes of grassroots party members.

Originally only members of two years' standing were eligible to vote, but this was later widened to all ALP party members who were financial as of 7 September 2013.

Aftermath
With the leadership decided, caucus elections (without general party membership involvement) were held to determine the shadow ministry. In a return to ALP tradition, the shadow ministry were elected by caucus, with portfolio responsibilities to be assigned by the leader. Anna Burke, Warren Snowdon and Laurie Ferguson complained publicly about the process.

Candidates

Declared
Anthony Albanese, Deputy Prime Minister (2013)
Supporters: Greg Combet, Jenny Macklin, and Penny Wong
Bill Shorten, Minister for Workplace Relations (2011-2013) and Minister for Education (2013)
Supporters: Paul Howes, Nicola Roxon, Kate Ellis, Peter Beattie, Mark Latham, Bob Carr, and Simon Crean

Declined
The following individuals ruled themselves out as candidates or were the subject of media speculation but did not stand:
Chris Bowen, Treasurer (2013) and interim leader (2013) 
Tony Burke, Minister for Immigration (2013)
Bob Carr, Minister for Foreign Affairs (2012-2013) and Premier of New South Wales (1995-2005)
Jason Clare, Minister for Justice and Home Affairs (2011-2013)
Tanya Plibersek, Minister for Health (2011-2013)
Wayne Swan, Deputy Prime Minister (2010-2013) and Treasurer (2007-2013)

See also

Australian Labor Party leadership spill, 2010
Australian Labor Party leadership spill, 2012
Australian Labor Party leadership spill, March 2013
Australian Labor Party leadership spill, June 2013
2013 Australian federal election

References

2013 elections in Australia
Australian Labor Party leadership spills
October 2013 events in Australia
Australian Labor Party leadership election